The Guilford Place drinking fountain is a Grade II listed drinking fountain at Guilford Place, London WC1, built in about 1870, and designed by the architect Henry Darbishire, for the Misses Whiting to commemorate their mother.

References

External links
 

Grade II listed buildings in the London Borough of Camden
Drinking fountains in the United Kingdom